Rubik Stepanyan (born 3 January 1958), is an Armenian politician, Member of the National Assembly of Armenia of Bright Armenia's faction.

References 

1958 births
Living people
21st-century Armenian politicians